International recognition of Transnistria (also known as Pridnestrovie) – a disputed region in Eastern Europe located between Moldova and Ukraine – is controversial. Although Transnistria declared independence in 1990, no United Nations member recognises its sovereignty and the region is considered by the UN to be part of Moldova. Currently, only Abkhazia, the Republic of Artsakh and South Ossetia recognise its independence, all themselves states with limited recognition. Despite not officially recognizing Transnistria's independence, Russia has close relations with Transnistria and even established a consulate in the territory. The Council of Europe considers the region an Russian-occupied territory.

History

In 1990, a Pridnestrovian Moldavian SSR (PMR) was proclaimed in the region by a number of conservative local Soviet officials opposed to perestroika. This action was immediately declared void by the then General Secretary of the Communist Party of the Soviet Union Mikhail Gorbachev. After the dissolution of the Soviet Union in 1991, Moldova, including Transnistria, became independent. The PMR side said Moldova's declaration of independence was ill-conceived and that it considers the Molotov–Ribbentrop Pact to be null and void. The PMR side argues that if this is so, then the Moldovans themselves had agreed to relinquish Transnistria, as this territory never belonged to Moldova, nor to Romania before the signing of the agreement between the USSR and Germany.

During the 1992 Transnistria War some villages changed hands between the PMR government and Moldova proper. PMR forces have often clashed with Moldova's representatives.

Foreign policy
Government documents from Transnistria state that the republic has "established and maintained friendly relations with countries seeking recognition." To this end, it said that relations would continue to develop in a friendly manner with the three states/political entities it has relations with: the Republic of Abkhazia, the Republic of Artsakh, and the Republic of South Ossetia.

It sought to have relations with other foreign countries and international organizations, especially those of Europe, which were seen as "of paramount importance". The pro-European orientation was a consequence of a "general understanding of fundamental values of the world civilization. A lot of Pridnestrovian foreign interests lie in this area. The importance of a harmonic inclusion of Pridnestrovie into the international democratic community makes necessary an active cooperation." Another avenue of importance was cooperation with the Organization for Security and Cooperation in Europe because its importance "as a mediator in the negotiation process between Moldova and Pridnestrovie... in ensuring regional stability." Transnistria's goal was to "rest on the European experience in the future for its positive political, economic, scientific and technical, and cultural development."

Transnistria is member state of the Community for Democracy and Rights of Nations. The government of Moldova does not actively prevent or seek to prevent representatives of other states from interacting with the government of Transnistria.

States which formally recognise Transnistria as independent

UN non-member states

States that do not recognise Transnistria as independent

UN member states

Positions taken by international organizations

See also
 Political status of Transnistria
 Foreign relations of Transnistria
 Kosovo independence precedent
 List of states with limited recognition

Notes

References

Politics of Transnistria
Politics of Moldova
Foreign relations of Transnistria
Transnistria